Vietnamese New Zealanders are New Zealanders of partially or full Vietnamese  ancestry.

According to the 2018 census, 10,086 New Zealanders identify themselves as with the Vietnamese ethnic group. Many of them came to New Zealand to escape religious persecution or war.

History
Vietnamese people began arriving in New Zealand during the mid-1970s and early 1980s as refugees following the end of the Vietnam War owing to fear of persecution or uncertainty under a new Communist government. New Zealand was one of the countries that assisted in the resettlement of Vietnamese refugees, with the first arrivals in 1977 when 412 refugees were accepted. The largest intake of Vietnamese refugees occurred in 1979–1980 when about 1,500 arrived with approximately 4,500 Vietnamese being accepted for resettlement between 1977 and 1993. Many of them settled in large urban areas. Owing to the economic troubles of the 1980s in which many had lost their factory jobs and isolation, about 1/3 of the population moved to Australia where there were larger Vietnamese communities.

Currently, in the 2018 Census, there are 10,086  Vietnamese living in New Zealand, with the majority being concentrated in Auckland, Wellington, and Christchurch.

See also

New Zealand–Vietnam relations

References

External links
 Te Ara Encyclopedia of New Zealand: Vietnamese

Asian New Zealander
New Zealand